The flag of Libya from 1977 to 2011 was used by the Socialist People's Libyan Arab Jamahiriya from 1977 to 1986 and later the Great Socialist People's Libyan Arab Jamahiriya until 2011. The design is a green field in 1:2 ratio and was considered the only solid colour national flag in the world during its time.

In 2011, after the collapse of Gaddafi's government, the 1951–1969 flag from the Kingdom of Libya was re-adopted but the flag introduced by Gaddafi remained in use by Pro-Gaddafists and Gaddafi loyalists. Before 1977, the country was called the Libyan Arab Republic from 1969 to 1977 and used a red-white-black flag similar to most traditional Arab national flags bearing a resemblance to the modern flag of Yemen. in 1977 after the Egyptian-Libyan War, the blank green flag was introduced to replace the red-white-black flag to avoid similarities with Egypt.

History of Libya under Muammar Gaddafi
Flags introduced in 1977
1977 establishments in Libya
2011 disestablishments in Libya